Gavin Dunbar may refer to:

 Gavin Dunbar (bishop of Aberdeen) (died 1532)
 Gavin Dunbar (archbishop of Glasgow) (c. 1490–1547)
 Gavin Dunbar (musician), bass player with Camera Obscura